The Flint River Regional Library System (FRRLS) is a collection of nine public libraries in the Atlanta metropolitan area of Georgia. The library serves the residents of the following six counties: Butts, Fayette, Lamar, Monroe, Pike, and Spalding.

All of the locations in the FRRLS are part of PINES, a statewide consortium of libraries consisting of over 8 million materials and 275 libraries available for free to Georgia residents. The system is also a member of GALILEO (GeorgiA LIbrary LEarning Online) which offers more than 100 databases and 10,000 journals for research purposes.

Branches

Library systems in adjacent counties
Henry County Library System to the north
Atlanta-Fulton Public Library System to the northwest
Clayton County Library System to the northwest
Coweta Public Library System to the west
Newton County Library System to the north

References

External links
PINES catalog

Public libraries in Georgia (U.S. state)
Organizations based in Atlanta
County library systems in Georgia (U.S. state)